Two ships of the Royal Navy have been named HMS Curzon :
  was a  built in the US during World War II and provided to the British under the Lend-Lease Agreement.
 HMS Curzon  (M1136) was a Ton-class minesweeper which carried this name between 1960 and 1975.

References
 

Royal Navy ship names